The year 1644 in music involved some significant events and new musical works.

Events 
21 June – Future Dean of Salisbury Thomas Pierce graduates M.A. from Magdalen College, Oxford, where he is noted as a "musician and poet".
date unknown – Pieter and François Hemony cast the world's first tuned carillon, which is installed in Zutphen's Wijnhuistoren.

Publications 

Classical music 
Nicolaus à Kempis – , vol. 1
Bonaventura Rubino – 
Barbara Strozzi –

Opera
Francesco Sacrati – 
Sigmund Theophil Staden – , the first German 
Francesco Cavalli –  and

Births 
January 14 – Thomas Britton, English concert promoter (died 1714)
August 12 – Heinrich Ignaz Franz Biber, German composer of sonatas (died 1704)
December 23 – Tomás de Torrejón y Velasco, Peruvian organist and composer (died 1728)
date unknown 
Maria Cattarina Calegari, Italian composer, singer, organist, and nun (died after 1675) 
Václav Karel Holan Rovenský, Czech organist and composer (died 1718)
probable 
Ignazio Albertini, Italian violinist and composer (died 1685)
Giovanni Battista Vitali, Italian composer of sonatas (died 1692)

Deaths 
Robert Ramsey, British organist and composer (born 1590s)

References